Hysenbelliu is an Albanian surname. Notable people with the surname include:
Kasem Hysenbelliu (born 1961), Albanian businessman, philanthropist, intellectual 
Amarildo Hysenbelliu (born 1993), Albanian football midfielder
Fatmir Hysenbelliu (born 1992), Albanian footballer
Irfan Hysenbelliu (born 1959), Albanian businessman

Albanian-language surnames